Pichet Krungget (born 16 March 1975) is a Paralympian athlete from Thailand competing mainly in category T53 sprint events.

Has won five Paralympic medals over 2 games.  His first was a bronze in the T53 200m in 2004 Summer Paralympics where he also helped the Thai team to two gold medals in the 4 × 100 m and 4 × 400 m as well as competing in the individual 100m and 400m races.  Four years later in Beijing he competed in the individual 100m, 200m, 400m and 800m and with his team mates won silver medals in both the relays, finishing behind the Chinese in both.

References

External links
 

1975 births
Living people
Pichet Krungget
Pichet Krungget
Pichet Krungget
Pichet Krungget
Pichet Krungget
Athletes (track and field) at the 2004 Summer Paralympics
Athletes (track and field) at the 2008 Summer Paralympics
Athletes (track and field) at the 2012 Summer Paralympics
Medalists at the 2004 Summer Paralympics
Medalists at the 2008 Summer Paralympics
Paralympic medalists in athletics (track and field)
Athletes (track and field) at the 2020 Summer Paralympics
Pichet Krungget
Pichet Krungget
Medalists at the 2018 Asian Para Games